Cemmes Road was a railway station on the Newtown and Machynlleth Railway (N&MR) in Mid-Wales, serving the village of Cemmaes Road.

The N&MR passed through the Cambrian Mountains in the deep Talerddig cutting, which formed the summit of the line. From there it descended towards the coast, reaching the Dyfi valley at the village of Cemmaes Road, where there was a junction with the Mawddwy Railway.

The next station, north of Cemmes Road on the Mawddwy Railway, served the village of Cemmaes. To avoid confusion with that station, the N&MR's English backers named the junction station using an Anglicised version of the village's Welsh language name.

Cemmes Road closed as a result of the Beeching Axe in 1965, although the station building still exists as a private house.

References

Sources

Former Cambrian Railway stations
Railway stations in Great Britain opened in 1863
Railway stations in Great Britain closed in 1965
Disused railway stations in Powys
Beeching closures in Wales